Gervays is a surname. Notable people with the surname include:

Richard Gervays, MP
John Gervays

See also
Gervais (disambiguation)
Gervay